The 2021 Northeast Conference women's soccer tournament was the postseason women's soccer tournament for the Northeast Conference held on November 5 and 7, 2021. The three-match tournament took place at Central Connecticut Soccer Field in New Britain, Connecticut, home of the regular season champions and tournament #1 seed Central Connecticut State Blue Devils. The four-team single-elimination tournament consisted of two rounds based on seeding from regular season conference play. The defending champions were the Central Connecticut State Blue Devils, who won a tournament that was shortened to a single game in 2020 due to the COVID-19 pandemic.  Central Connecticut State successfully defended their title, defeating the Fairleigh Dickinson Knights 3–0 in the final. This was the twelfth Northeast Conference tournament title for the Central Connecticut women's soccer program, ten of which have come under the direction of head coach Mick D'Arcy.  This was also the fourth straight title for Central Connecticut and Mick D'Arcy. As tournament champions, Central Connecticut earned the Northeast Conference's automatic berth into the 2021 NCAA Division I Women's Soccer Tournament.

Seeding 
The top four teams from the 2021 regular season qualified for the 2021 Tournament.  Teams were seeded based on regular season points totals, and no tiebreakers were required as each team finished on a unique points total.  The top seed was the host institution for the tournament.

Bracket

Schedule

Semifinals

Final

Statistics

Goalscorers

All-Tournament team

Source:

MVP in bold

See also 
 Northeast Conference
 2021 NCAA Division I women's soccer season
 2021 NCAA Division I Women's Soccer Tournament

References 

Northeast Conference Women's Soccer Tournament
2021 Northeast Conference women's soccer season